Mississauga Secondary School (MSS) is a public high school located in Mississauga, Ontario. It operates under the Peel District School Board.

Description
Mississauga Secondary School offers a full range of courses providing all students the opportunity to obtain a secondary school diploma, as outlined in Ontario Secondary Schools Grades 9 to 12, Program and Diploma Requirements, 1999.

The school offers several programs for its student body of 1200. The curriculum being taught follows the standard Ontario school curriculum which offers students different pathways after high school. The courses offered serve the need of majority of the students with several different after school programs. Mississauga Secondary School offers an EHS (Explore High Skills) and a SHSM (Specialist High Skills Major) course in health and wellness. This program allows students to learn more about the health and wellness sector, while also taking regular high school courses.

The technology programs offered include transportation, manufacturing, hospitality and cosmetology. Students have the opportunity to take courses in broadcast arts as well as traditional visual, musical and dramatic arts. Subjects such as Mathematics, Science, History, Geography and Languages are enhanced with this accessibility to technology. The use of technology is promoted with the schools BYOD (Bring your own device) program allowing students to use a variety devices to further their education.

Ranking
According to the Fraser Institute, for the 2018 to 2019 school year, Mississauga Secondary School obtained a rank of 261 out of 739 Ontario secondary schools. It is ranked 22 out of 33 secondary schools in the city of Mississauga. It is also given an overall rating of 6.8/10 by the institute.

See also
List of high schools in Ontario

References

External links
 Mississauga Secondary School Website

Peel District School Board
High schools in Mississauga
Educational institutions established in 2005
2005 establishments in Ontario